Okotoks (originally ) is a town in the Calgary Region of Alberta, Canada. Okotoks has emerged as a bedroom community of Calgary. According to the 2016 Census, the town has a population of 28,881, making it the largest town in Alberta.

History 

The town's name is derived from "ohkotok", the Blackfoot First Nation word for "rock".

Before European settlement, journeying First Nations used the rock as a marker to find the river crossing situated at Okotoks. The tribes were nomadic and often followed large buffalo herds for their sustenance. David Thompson explored the area as early as 1800. Soon trading posts were established, including one built in 1874 at the Sheep River crossing in the current town. This crossing was on a trade route called the Macleod Trail, which led from Fort Benton, Montana to Calgary.

In 1879, the area saw the killing of the last buffalo. Government leasing of land for one cent per acre ($2.47/km²) began in 1880. This created a major change in the region.  The first settlers arrived in 1882.

A community grew around a sawmill that was established in 1891, and it would grow in size. The last stagecoach stopped in Okotoks in 1891 when rail service between Calgary and Fort Macleod replaced horse-drawn travel. By 1897 the community name had changed three times, first from Sheep Creek, to Dewdney after Edgar Dewdney the Lieutenant Governor of the Northwest Territories, and later being informed by post office authorities in Ottawa of an older settlement named Dewdney in Lower Mainland, British Columbia, the name Okotoks was chosen by local businessman John Lineham. The rail line is still a main line south to the U.S. border, but the last of the passenger service (Dayliner unit) ended in 1971.

In 2007, the energy efficient Drake Landing Solar Community was established in Okotoks.

Flooding 
Okotoks has experienced three major flooding events, in 1995, 2005 and 2013. The 2005 event, which affected much of southern Alberta, flooded virtually all lands adjacent to the Sheep River, including the central business district, were at least briefly flooded, with the most serious damage being inflicted to riverside pathways, parks and campgrounds. Okotoks was also affected by the 2013 Alberta floods.

Heritage conservation 
Numerous old buildings have been restored, and one house was even resituated blocks away to avoid destruction by the widening of the highway through the townsite.

Geography

Land annexation 
Effective July 1, 2017 the Government of Alberta approved the annexation of approximately 1,950 hectares (4,900 acres) of land. Okotoks and the Municipal District of Foothills reached an agreement more than three years after the town first issued its notice of intent to seek more land to accommodate its long-term growth plans. Okotoks will gain a 60-year land supply that will enable the Town to develop housing and other services over the next several decades.

Water conservation 
Although the Sheep River runs through Okotoks year round, artesian wells near the river supply the town with its water. In September 1998, Okotoks became one of the first communities in Canada to recognize its environmental limits to growth were restricted by the carrying capacity of the local watershed. In concern for the supply of water, the town announced a unique and controversial suggestion of capping its population at 25,000 residents. In an interview on The Current, Mayor Bill McAlpine stated that this objective may be politically difficult due to the surrounding region.

Climate 
Okotoks experiences a humid continental climate (Köppen Dfb), with generally warm summers and long, cold winters. Rainfall is usually limited to the summer, with most of it falling between the months of May and September.

Neighbourhoods 

Neighbourhoods of Okotoks are:

 Air Ranch
 Central Heights
 Cimarron
 Cornerstone
 Crystal Shores
 Crystal Ridge
 D'Arcy
 Downey Ridge
 Drake Landing
 Green Haven Estates
 Hunter's Glen
 Mountainview
 Olde Towne
 Rosemont
 Ranchers Rise
 Sandstone
 Sheep River Ridge
 Skunk Hollow
 Suntree
 Tower Hill
 Wedderburn
 Westmount
 Westridge
 Woodhaven

Demographics 

In the 2016 Census of Population conducted by Statistics Canada, the Town of Okotoks recorded a population of 28,881 living in 9,667 of its 9,840 total private dwellings, a  change from its 2011 population of 24,511.

The population of the Town of Okotoks according to its 2015 municipal census is 28,016, a  change from its 2014 municipal census population of 27,331. At its current population, Okotoks is the largest town in the province and is eligible for city status. According to Alberta's Municipal Government Act, a town is eligible for city status when it reaches 10,000 residents.

Almost 3% of Okotoks residents identified themselves as aboriginal at the time of the 2006 census. About 93% of residents identified English as their first language while 1.4% identified French and 1.0% identified German as their first language learned. The next most common languages were Spanish, Tagalog, Chinese, Korean, and Slovak.

Economy 

The sawmill that was established by John Lineham along the Sheep River in 1891 operated for 25 years and was a major part of the local economy. At one time it employed 135 people, producing an average of 30,000 feet (9,000 m) of lumber per day. The growth of the Canadian Pacific Railway created a demand for railway ties and the mill helped meet that demand. Logs were brought down from the west via the Sheep River. The mill has long since disappeared but one building (one of the oldest remaining in the township) still stands. It housed an award-winning (butter) dairy from the 1920s to the 1940s. It currently houses a law office and restaurant. In May 2015 the Old Creamery was severely damaged following a suspected arson attack. On 15 June 2015 the Town Council voted to demolish the building.

In 1900, just west of Okotoks, four brick-making plants were opened. Many of the first brick buildings in Okotoks (of which a number still exist) were constructed using locally-made brick. The industry reached its peak in 1912, when twelve million bricks were manufactured. The outbreak of World War I caused the shutdown of “Sandstone” as it was known.

By 1906 the population had hit 1900, a figure that would not be reached again until 1977.

Oil was discovered west of Okotoks on October 7, 1913. Okotoks became the supply centre. In its heyday, from 1913 to the 1960s, Okotoks was busy with horses, wagons, and transports hauling all types of equipment to the oil fields, and crude oil back through town to refineries in Calgary.

The Texas Gulf sulphur plant (known as CanOxy) opened in 1959, employing 45 people. It was not unusual to see the bright yellow, three-story high, block-long, block-wide pile of sulphur waiting to be melted or ground up and poured into railway cars.

Since 1974, Okotoks has been hosting a collector car auction in late May. It is the longest running collector car auction in Canada.

Okotoks was one of the few communities its size with its own airport. A number of small air shows were held there over the years. It was the home of an aircraft charter company, flight school, and a helicopter flying school. The site has now evolved into an airpark community called the Calgary/Okotoks Air Park, where the property owners, if they wish, can build homes with attached hangars for their private planes. There is also a small private aerodrome, Calgary/Okotoks (Rowland Field) Aerodrome. Otherwise, like other communities in the vicinity of Calgary, it is served by Calgary International Airport.

See also 

List of communities in Alberta
List of towns in Alberta

References

Further reading

External links 

 
1899 establishments in the Northwest Territories
Towns in Alberta